Malaysia competed at the 1968 Summer Olympics in Mexico City, Mexico. 31 competitors, all men, took part in 14 events in 4 sports. This time, Singapore and Malaysia sent separate teams after sending a combined team at the previous Olympics as Singapore was expelled from the federation in 1965.

Athletics

Men
Track events

Field events

Cycling

Road

Hockey

Men's tournament
Team roster

 Ho Koh Chye (C)
 Francis Belavantheran
 Sri Shanmuganathan
 Michael Arulraj
 Kunaratnam Alagaratnam
 Ameenuddin bin Mohamed Ibrahim

 Joseph Johnson
 Savinder Singh
 Arumugam Sabapathy
 Yang Siow Ming
 Koh Hock Seng
 Harnahal Singh Sewa

 Koh Chong Jin
 Shamuganathan Jeevajothy
 Rajaratnam Yogeswaran
 Kuldip Singh Uijeer
 Loong Whey Pyu

Group B

Fifteen and sixteen place match

Ranked 15th in final standings

Weightlifting

Men

References

External links
 Official Olympic Reports

Nations at the 1968 Summer Olympics
1968